NC 45-0095 is a synthetic nonsteroidal selective estrogen receptor modulator (SERM) which was under development by Novo Nordisk for the treatment of postmenopausal osteoporosis but was never marketed. It is a partial agonist of the estrogen receptor ( (for binding inhibition) = 9.5 nM;  = 13 nM) with mixed estrogenic and antiestrogenic activity, and shows full estrogenic activity in bone and uterus ( (relative to moxestrol, in Ishikawa endometrial cancer cell line) = 105%). The compound is a pyrroloindolizine derivative. Its development was discontinued by 2003.

See also
 List of selective estrogen receptor modulators

References

External links
 NNC-450095 - AdisInsight

Abandoned drugs
Indolizines
Phenols
Pyrroles
Selective estrogen receptor modulators